The Tropicana Las Vegas is a casino hotel on the Las Vegas Strip in Paradise, Nevada. It is owned and operated by Bally's Corporation, on land leased from Gaming and Leisure Properties.

This location, the Tropicana – Las Vegas Boulevard intersection, has the most hotel rooms of any intersection in the world. Pedestrians are not allowed to cross at street level. Instead, the Tropicana is linked by overhead pedestrian bridges to its neighboring casinos: to the north across Tropicana Avenue, the MGM Grand, and to the west across the Strip, the Excalibur.

History

In 1955, Ben Jaffe, an executive of the Fontainebleau Miami Beach, came to Las Vegas and bought a 40-acre parcel at the corner of Las Vegas Boulevard and Bond Road (now Tropicana Avenue). Jaffe aimed to build the finest hotel in Las Vegas, featuring a Cuban ambience, with four room themes for guests to choose from: French Provincial, Far East, Italian Renaissance, and Drexel. M. Tony Sherman of Miami was the architect and Taylor Construction Company was the general contractor.

Construction ran over schedule and over budget, due in part to competition for labor with the under-construction Stardust down the road. Jaffe had to sell his interest in the Fontainebleau to complete the project, which finally opened in April 1957. Performers included Eddie Fisher, Neile Adams, Cathy Crosby, Carol Channing, and Elaine Dunn. The original showgirls included Pat Sheehan, Adelle August, Evelyn Dutton, Honey Merrill, Betty Jean Hansen, Marilyn Johnson, Leona Gage, Felicia Atkins, and Kathleen Wakefield.

Jaffe first leased the property to his associate, Phil Kastel. The Gaming Control Board raised suspicions over Kastel's links to organized crime, which were confirmed in May when a note bearing a Tropicana earnings figure was found in the possession of mobster Frank Costello. Jaffe next turned to J. Kell Housells, owner of the Las Vegas Club. By 1959, Housells bought out Jaffe's interest, gaining a majority share in the Tropicana.

In the early 1970s, the Tropicana fared poorly from competition with larger hotels like Caesars Palace and the Las Vegas Hilton. Houssels sold out in 1968 to Trans-Texas Airways. Deil Gustafson, a Minnesota financier, bought the Tropicana in 1972. He undertook an expansion plan, but ran into financing difficulties. Edward and Fred Doumani took over management on an emergency basis in 1974 after investing $1 million into the property. Mitzi Stauffer Briggs, heir to the Stauffer Chemical fortune, bought a majority interest in the Tropicana in 1975. Briggs began construction of the 22-floor Tiffany Tower in 1977.

The Tropicana became the target of a mob skimming operation in 1978. Joe Agosto, the owner of the casino's Folies Bergere show, oversaw the siphoning of money from the cashier cage to the Kansas City crime family. The scheme was exposed in 1979 by an FBI investigation into hidden mob interests in Las Vegas casinos. Briggs and Gustafson faced revocation of their gaming licenses because they had allowed Agosto to manage the casino without a license. They had little choice but to sell the Tropicana. Hotel chain Ramada Inns purchased the business in December 1979, along with the 50% share of the property's real estate that had been owned by the Doumanis.

A 21-story Island Tower was constructed in 1986.

Ramada spun off its gaming properties, including the Tropicana, in 1989 as Aztar Corporation.

The Tropicana's country club was closed in 1990 after being sold to MGM Grand Inc. to become part of the site of the new MGM Grand casino.

In 2002, Aztar consolidated ownership of the Tropicana by buying the remaining 50% interest in the land and buildings from the Jaffe family for $117.5 million.

Aztar was acquired by Columbia Sussex in January 2007. A $2-billion renovation of the Tropicana was announced, planned to be completed in 2010, making it the largest resort casino in the world. The existing Paradise and Island towers would have received both interior and exterior renovations, and four new towers would have been built on the property, one of which would be branded as a separate hotel.

The plans included a  casino, five hotel towers totaling 10,000 rooms, and a sprawling  retail promenade. Other amenities included spas and fitness centers; more than 20 restaurants and lounges; a 1,500-seat entertainment venue for big-name headliners; and a water–ride attraction.

All improvements to the property were put on hold because of the financial crisis of 2007–2008, and became moot when Columbia Sussex's gaming arm filed for bankruptcy in 2008. The Tropicana, which had a $440 million secured loan against it, was bought from the bankrupt company in July 2009 by its creditors, led by Canadian private equity firm Onex Corporation and former MGM Mirage CEO Alex Yemenidjian, who took over as CEO.

The remainder of Columbia Sussex's gaming business, reorganized under new ownership as Tropicana Entertainment Inc., promptly sued the Las Vegas property, demanding royalties for use of the Tropicana name. The case was eventually settled, with the Tropicana Las Vegas receiving exclusive rights to use the name in the Las Vegas region, royalty-free.

In August 2009, Yemenidjian announced a $165-million plan to renovate the property around a South Beach theme, to be done in several phases. The first phase would renovate the Tropicana's back office facilities, with completion planned for the end of 2009. The second phase would renovate the conference facilities, rooms, and common areas, with construction to finish at the end of August 2010. The third phase, including a Nikki Beach Night Club and Nikki Beach multimillion-dollar pool renovation was planned to be completed by April 2011.

In 2010, the Tropicana demolished two wings. One, built in 1964, was on the north side of the resort facing Tropicana Ave, removed to make room for a second entrance to the property and open up space for additional parking. The other, built in 1959, was on the east side of the resort. 

In February 2011, the Tropicana opened a new sports book, operated by Cantor Gaming.

In 2012, the Tropicana announced an affiliation with DoubleTree by Hilton.

In August 2015, Penn National Gaming (later Penn Entertainment) purchased the Tropicana for $360 million.

In December 2016, as part of Penn's Interactive Division, the Tropicana created an online experience for customers to play.

During the COVID-19 pandemic, Penn faced the prospect of financial issues brought on by resort closures. As a result, Penn sold the land occupied by the Tropicana to its spin-off company, Gaming and Leisure Properties, Inc. (GLPI). Penn sold the land for $337.5 million in rent credits, and the sale was finalized in April 2020. Penn would continue to operate the Tropicana for another two years, or until the resort were sold.

In September 2022, Bally's Corporation bought the non-land assets of the Tropicana from GLPI and Penn for $148 million, and leased the land from GLPI for annual rent of $10.5 million.

Film history
A scene from Folies Bergere is featured in the 1964 Elvis Presley film Viva Las Vegas.
In the 7th James Bond film, Diamonds Are Forever, 007 stays at the Tropicana, because he has heard it is "quite comfortable."
The Las Vegas sequence of The Godfather was filmed in the Tropicana.
The hotel is also referred briefly in The Godfather Part II, and a few deleted scenes take place inside the hotel. To avoid copyright issues, the name of the hotel was changed to "Tropigala" during filming, although the original name remained in the final draft of the script.
The TV series Vega$ was also filmed at the Tropicana Hotel during the 1970s, although it wasn't the principal hotel used in the series. The former Desert Inn and Country Club was the main hotel used and seen throughout the series.
It was featured on the TV show Charlie's Angels in the episode "Angels in Vegas" in 1978, with Dean Martin guest starring. The hotel exterior and interior were used for location filming of the episode the end of January beginning of February 1978. Episode aired in April 1978.
It was featured on the TV show Angel in the episode "The House Always Wins" as the casino where the character Lorne had his show.
A show was taped here for Malcolm in the Middle in 2003.
A two-part episode of Designing Women, part of season 7, was set here. In the episodes, Anthony meets and marries a showgirl from the Folies Begere.
The game shows Dealer's Choice and Las Vegas Gambit were taped here.
The first half of the first season of the revival of the game show Let's Make a Deal was being taped here. Hosted by Wayne Brady, it began airing on CBS October 5, 2009. The show moved to Los Angeles during a reconstruction period.

Amenities and entertainment

Shows
The largest venue at the property is the 1,100-seat Tropicana Theater, which features the Prince tribute show Purple Reign (since 2017) and the Michael Jackson tribute show MJ Live (since 2022). The venue opened in 1973 as the Superstar Theater. It was renamed as the Tiffany Theatre in 1975. In 2011, it became the Gladys Knight Theater when the singer began a residency at the venue. It was renamed as the Tropicana Theater later that year, after Knight's departure. From 2019 to 2022, it hosted the celebrity impersonator revue Legends in Concert and was named the Legends in Concert Theater. Other productions at the theater have included magician Rick Thomas (1997–2005); magician Dirk Arthur (2005–2010); singer Wayne Newton (2009–2010); percussion group Recycled Percussion (2010–2012); a live production of Dancing with the Stars (2012); Mamma Mia!, the Broadway musical based on the songs of ABBA (2014); Raiding the Rock Vault, a musical featuring classic rock songs (2014–2016); illusionist Jan Rouven (2014–2016); and illusionist David Goldrake (2017–2018).

A showroom on the Tropicana's mezzanine level is occupied by the Laugh Factory, a comedy club offering two nightly stand-up comedy shows, as well as nightly performances by impressionist Rich Little and comic magician Murray Sawchuck. The space opened in 1988 as Rodney's Place, a comedy club associated with Rodney Dangerfield, which closed after six months. It then operated as the Comedy Stop from 1990 to 2009. The venue next became the Bobby Slayton Room, offering regular shows by the comedian and several other performers. It then opened as Brad Garrett's Comedy Club in 2010. Garrett's club departed in 2011 to move to the MGM Grand. The Laugh Factory took over the space in 2012.

From 1959, the Tropicana hosted the Folies Bergére Show, the longest running revue theater show in Las Vegas. Directed by and Choreographed by Jerry Jackson. It closed down March 27, 2009, shortly before its 50th anniversary. Dave Brubeck's 1966 live album, Jackpot!, was recorded at the Tropicana.

Attractions
From 1999 to 2005, the Tropicana was the home of the Casino Legends Hall of Fame. The facility displayed artifacts and memorabilia from hundreds of casinos, and held induction ceremonies to honor notable Las Vegas entertainers and gaming industry figures. It was quickly replaced by the Las Vegas Historic Museum, which then closed in 2006.

An exhibit space at the Tropicana hosted "Titanic: The Artifact Exhibition" beginning in 2005. It was joined in 2006 by "Bodies: The Exhibition", a display of preserved human bodies. The two exhibits, both produced by Premier Exhibitions, closed in 2008 to move to the Luxor.

They were replaced in March 2011 by the Las Vegas Mob Experience, an attraction describing the rise and fall of organized crime in Las Vegas, featuring mob artifacts, holograms of famed gangsters such as Bugsy Siegel and Meyer Lansky, and live actors. After being plagued by technical problems, litigation, and low ticket sales, and going through a bankruptcy and partial closure, the exhibit became known as the Mob Attraction Las Vegas in March 2012. It closed in November 2013.

Dining
Celebrity chef Robert Irvine opened his restaurant at the Tropicana, Robert Irvine's Public House, in July 2017. Other dining options include the Italian restaurant Bacio and Oakville Steakhouse.

Other amenities
Other amenities at the property include boutique stores; a swimming pool with tropical landscaping, waterfalls and an outdoor bar; and a wedding chapel. The Tropicana also contains the resort office for Virgin Holidays.

References

External links

 

 
Casinos in the Las Vegas Valley
Skyscraper hotels in Paradise, Nevada
Casinos completed in 1957
Hotel buildings completed in 1957
Hotels established in 1957
Resorts in the Las Vegas Valley
Casino hotels
1957 establishments in Nevada